In the study of transsexualism, the essentialist idea of a feminine essence refers to the proposal that trans women are females trapped in male bodies.  This idea has been interpreted in many senses, as a female mind, spirit, soul, personality, etc., as well as in more literal senses such as having a female brain structure; it is also a psychological narrative, that is, a self-description of how some transsexuals see themselves, or of how they may portray themselves to qualify for certain medical treatments.

According to sexologist J. Michael Bailey and Kiira Triea, "the predominant cultural understanding of male-to-female transsexualism is that all male-to-female (MtF) transsexuals are, essentially, women trapped in men's bodies."  They reject the idea, claiming that "The persistence of the predominant cultural understanding, while explicable, is damaging to science and to many transsexuals."  According to sexologist Ray Blanchard, "Transsexuals seized upon this phrase as the only language available for explaining their predicament to themselves and for communicating their feelings to others. The great majority of patients understand full well that this is a façon de parler, not a literal statement of fact, and are not delusional in any normal sense of the word."

The feminine essence idea has been described under several names, and there is no authoritative, widely accepted definition.  It was called the feminine essence narrative by Alice Dreger in 2008, and the feminine essence theory by Ray Blanchard, who formulated the concept into a set of logical propositions. Other names include Harry Benjamin syndrome, after one of the early sexologists whose early writings about the nature of transsexualism, along with those of psychiatrist David O. Cauldwell, are favorably cited by proponents in support of this idea.

This idea is associated with, but separate from the brainsex theory of transsexualism, which is a belief about a neurodevelopmental cause of transsexualism. Proponents of the brainsex theory of transsexualism draw a distinction between "brain sex" and "anatomical sex".  Some proponents reject the term transsexual, as the trans- prefix implies that their true sex is changing, instead of being affirmed, with treatments like sex reassignment surgery.  Some proponents consider themselves to be intersex instead of transgender. A figurative interpretation, involving neurologically mediated gender identity, was supported historically by pioneering sexologists such as Harry Benjamin.

Description

The "feminine essence" idea predates modern psychological studies, and was supported by some early sexologists such as Harry Benjamin ("the father of transsexualism"), who revived the idea of Karl-Heinrich Ulrichs that a person might have a "female soul trapped in a male body."

Modern researchers classify the common story told by transsexual women about themselves as a psychological narrative, and therefore refer to this idea as the "feminine essence narrative".  In his book The Man Who Would Be Queen, sexologist J. Michael Bailey gives these statements as a prototypical example of the feminine essence narrative:  "Since I can remember, I have always felt as if I were a member of the other sex. I have felt like a freak with this body and detest my penis. I must get sex reassignment surgery (a "sex change operation") in order to match my external body with my internal mind."

Blanchard's deconstruction

In 2008, Ray Blanchard presented the idea in the form of a theory in a commentary entitled "Deconstructing the Feminine Essence Narrative" in which he lists what he considers to be "the central tenets of the feminine essence theory", and then refutes each of these tenets:

Neuroanatomic research

According to Bailey and Triea, one of the predictions based on the feminine essence theory is that male-to-female transsexuals would possess female rather than male brain anatomy. A widely cited research study of this topic examined the brain anatomy of six deceased male-to-female transsexuals, who had undergone during their lives hormonal treatment and surgical sex reassignment. The study reported that a brain structure called the "central subdivision of the bed nucleus of the stria terminalis" (BSTc), which is larger in typical males than in typical females, was in the female range in the transsexual subjects. The interpretation and the methods of that study have been criticized, and the finding continues to be a matter of debate.

Neurological research has found that the brains of transsexuals differ in a number of ways.  For example, a study done on the brains of non-homosexual transsexuals using MRI and pheromones as stimuli found that transsexuals process smelling androgen and estrogen in the same way that women do. Previous research by the same team found that homosexual males also process smelling the pheromones of the sexes in a way that is similar to that of women.  Work done by Simon LeVay had previously found that the hypothalamus of homosexual males has a region which is similar in size to that of heterosexual females.  This is not so in non-homosexual males. A study done by Hilleke E Hulshoff Pol reached the conclusion that the brain changes in overall volume and the volume of its parts with the use of cross-sex hormone supplements.  In the case of male-to-female transsexuals, the brain assumes the proportions of a female brain.

Other findings 
The main support for the feminine essence narrative is that many male-to-female transsexuals say they feel it to be true; many autobiographical and clinical accounts by or about transsexual individuals contain variations of the statement of having a female soul or needing to make the external body resemble the inner or true self.

Critics of this narrative consider it to be inconsistent with their research findings.  Blanchard has reported finding that there are two, and not one, types of male-to-female transsexual and that they differ with regard to their sexual interests, whether they were overtly gender atypical in childhood, how easily they pass as female, the ages at which they decide to transition to female, birth order, and their physical height and weight. There have also been findings that the groups differ in how well they respond to sex reassignment and how likely they are to regret having transitioned. These sexologists have therefore posited that more than one motivator can lead a biological male to desire to live life as female, but that there is no evidence for a core essence of femininity.

Role of medical community

Since the medical community has guidelines for what types of individuals qualify for sex reassignment surgery, transsexual persons sometimes adopt and tell the story that they believe will best help them qualify – the "feminine essence narrative" – and representing themselves as "essentially female", which may explain at least part of the prevalence of the feminine essence narrative.

Terminology

The phrase "feminine soul enclosed in a male body" (anima muliebris in corpore virili inclusa) was introduced in 1868 by Karl-Heinrich Ulrichs, not to describe male-to-female transsexuals, but to describe a type of gay men who self-identified as feminine.  Major sexologists in the 19th century picked up the idea that a homosexual was "a female soul in a male body, a condition deriving from an error in embryonic differentiation."
Those homosexuals who felt themselves to be female were categorized, "in the interest of scientific precision," as "Urnings" (English uranians).

See also
Blanchard's transsexualism typology
Causes of gender incongruence
Classification of transsexual and transgender people

References

Sexology
Transgender studies
Trans women
Femininity
Essentialism